Haplogroup O mtDNA is a haplogroup derived from haplogroup N and found in Oceania.

It is one of the rarest haplogroups. As of 2022, FamilyTreeDNA reports that only 4 people are known members of the haplogroup. YFull reports 5 known members, 4 of whom are from Australia, and that the haplogroup is at least 20,000 years old.

Notes

See also

Genealogical DNA test
Genetic genealogy
Human mitochondrial genetics
Population genetics
Human mitochondrial DNA haplogroups

O